The Alaska Peninsula (also called Aleut Peninsula or Aleutian Peninsula, ; Sugpiaq: Aluuwiq, Al'uwiq) is a peninsula extending about  to the southwest from the mainland of Alaska and ending in the Aleutian Islands.  The peninsula separates the Pacific Ocean from Bristol Bay, an arm of the Bering Sea. 

In literature (especially Russian) the term "Alaska Peninsula" was used to denote the entire northwestern protrusion of the North American continent, or all of what is now the state of Alaska, exclusive of its panhandle and islands. The Lake and Peninsula borough, the Alaskan equivalent of a county, is named after the peninsula. 

The Alaska/Aleutian Peninsula is also grouped into Southwest Alaska.

The other largest peninsulas in Alaska include the Kenai Peninsula and Seward Peninsula.

Geography

The base of the Alaska Peninsula extends out from the end of the Alaska Range. 

The Aleutian Range is a highly active volcanic mountain range which runs along the entire length of the Peninsula. Within it lie Wildlife Refuges, including the Katmai National Park and Preserve, the Aniakchak National Monument and Preserve and the Becharof National Wildlife Refuge, the Alaska Peninsula National Wildlife Refuge, and the Izembek National Wildlife Refuge. The most active volcano along the volcanic mountain range is Pavlof Volcano which is more than 2,515 meters (8,251 feet). 

The southern side of the Alaska Peninsula is rugged and mountainous, created by the uplifting tectonic activity of the North Pacific Plate subsiding under a western section of the North American Plate; the northern side is generally flat and marshy, a result of millennia of erosion and general seismic stability. The northern and southern shores are likewise quite different. The northern Bristol Bay coastal side is generally turbid and muddy, experiences tidal extremes, and is relatively shallow; the Pacific side, which is also known as the "ring of fire," has relatively small tidal activity and the water is deep and clear.

Administration
All of the Peninsula is organized as a part of four adjacent boroughs; the Aleutians East Borough, Bristol Bay Borough, Kodiak Island Borough, and Lake and Peninsula Borough. The Lake and Peninsula Borough includes most of the peninsula's territory.

Climate
Coastal areas are subject to intense storms, wind, and rain. Frosts can occur any day of the year at higher elevations. The climate can be compared to that of parts of Scotland, the Aleutian Islands, Iceland, and Tierra del Fuego.

Flora and fauna

The Alaska Peninsula is home to some of the largest populations of native and undisturbed wildlife in the United States. Besides the famous McNeil River and Katmai Alaskan brown bear populations, large herds of caribou, moose, wolves waterfowl, and willow ptarmigan inhabit the area. The bears of the peninsula and Bristol Bay are so numerous because they feed on the world's largest sockeye salmon (Oncorhynchus nerka) runs, which occur here in large part because the many large lakes of the peninsula are an important element in their lifecycle. These salmon, after returning from their short time at sea, swim into the lakes and their contributing streams to spawn. Their offspring, or fry, overwinter in the deep and food-abundant depths of these lakes until their migration to the sea in one or two years.

Exceptionally large seabird colonies exist along the coast. Additionally, there are large populations of sea mammals in the North Pacific Ocean between the Alaska Peninsula and Kamchatka. This includes harbor seals, ringed seals, northern fur seals, whales, porpoises, sea otters and sea lions.

The rugged southern half of the peninsula, and also the Kodiak Archipelago which lie off the south coast of the peninsula and are home to even more bears, constitute the Alaska Peninsula montane taiga ecoregion and contain a number of protected areas such as Katmai National Park. Vegetation on the Peninsula consists mostly of shrub-lands, grassy meadows, or wet tundra.

Demographics

Besides the communities on the coast (see: Bristol Bay), the Alaska Peninsula also is home to several well-known villages: Cold Bay, King Cove, Perryville, Chignik, Chignik Lake, Chignik Lagoon, and Port Moller. Each is primarily inhabited by Alaska Natives and each, likewise, is mostly dependent on the fishing industry for sustenance. The village of Sand Point should be included here, despite its location on Popof Island, an island of the Shumagin Islands, just off the southern coast of the Peninsula.

References

External links 
Ugashik Area website
Lake & Peninsula Borough
Lake and Peninsula School District
Alaska Peninsula Trek
 Trawl survey of shrimp and forage fish in Alaska's Westward region, 2006 / by David R. Jackson. Hosted by Alaska State Publications Program.

Landforms of Aleutians East Borough, Alaska
Landforms of Bristol Bay Borough, Alaska
Landforms of Kenai Peninsula Borough, Alaska
Landforms of Kodiak Island Borough, Alaska
Landforms of Lake and Peninsula Borough, Alaska
Peninsulas of Alaska
Volcanic arcs